Jacopo Surricchio (born 17 January 2006) is an Italian professional footballer who plays as a midfielder for the youth sector of  club Roma.

Career

Early career 
Born in Sambuceto, in the Province of Chieti, Italy, Surricchio began playing football aged four-and-a-half at Giovanile Chieti, before joining Chieti and Teramo's youth teams. On 11 March 2021, he made his Campionato Primavera 3 (under-19) debut for Teramo, aged 15.

On 23 October 2021, Surricchio made his professional debut aged , as an 83rd-minute substitute in a 4–0 Serie C defeat to Cesena.

Roma 
On 18 January 2022, he transferred to Serie A club Roma on loan, and was assigned to their under-17 squad. Following the loan expiry in summer of 2022, Surricchio was permanently signed by Roma on a free transfer as Teramo were excluded from the upcoming 2022–23 Serie C championship, and all their players were subsequently released.

References

External links 
 

2006 births
Living people
Sportspeople from the Province of Chieti
Footballers from Abruzzo
Italian footballers
Association football midfielders
S.S. Teramo Calcio players
A.S. Roma players
Serie C players